Air China Limited is the flag carrier of the People's Republic of China and one of the "Big Three" mainland Chinese airlines (alongside China Southern Airlines and China Eastern Airlines). Air China's headquarters are in Shunyi District, Beijing. Air China's flight operations are based primarily at Beijing Capital International Airport. In 2017, the airline carried 102 million domestic and international passengers with an average load factor of 81%. The airline joined Star Alliance in 2007.

History

Early years

Air China was established and commenced operations on 1 July 1988 as a result of the Chinese government's decision in late 1987 to split the operating divisions of Civil Aviation Administration of China (CAAC Airlines) into six separate airlines: Air China, China Eastern, China Southern, China Northern, China Southwest, and China Northwest. Air China was given chief responsibility for intercontinental flights and took over the CAAC's long haul aircraft (Boeing 747s, 767s, and 707s) and routes.

In January 2001, the former CAAC's ten airlines agreed on a merger plan, according to which Air China was to acquire China Southwest Airlines. Before this acquisition, Air China was the country's fourth largest domestic airline. The merger created a group with assets of 56 billion Yuan (US$8.63 billion), and a fleet of 118 aircraft. In October 2002, Air China consolidated with the China National Aviation Holding and China Southwest Airlines.

On 15 December 2004, Air China was successfully listed on the Hong Kong and London Stock Exchanges.
In 2006, Air China signed an agreement to join the Star Alliance. It became a member of the alliance on 12 December 2007 alongside Shanghai Airlines.

In July 2009, Air China acquired $19.3 millions of shares from its troubled subsidiary Air Macau, lifting its stake in the carrier from 51% to 80.9%. One month later, Air China spent HK$6.3 billion (US$813 million) to raise its stake in Cathay Pacific from 17.5% to 30%, expanding its presence in Hong Kong.

Development since 2010
In April 2010, Air China completed the increase of shareholdings in Shenzhen Airlines and became the controlling shareholder of Shenzhen Airlines, allowing Air China to further enhance its position in Beijing, Chengdu, and Shanghai as well as achieve a more balanced domestic network.

On 2 December 2010, Air China received Spain's highest tourism industry award, the "Plaque for Tourist Merit." Air China was the first foreign airline to receive the award, which is given to organisations and individuals contributing to the Spanish tourism industry.

On 23 December 2010, Air China became the first Chinese airline to offer combined tickets that include domestic flights and shuttle bus services to nearby cities. The first combined flight-shuttle bus ticket connected Tianjin via shuttle bus with domestic flights passing through Beijing.

Air China began offering free Wi-Fi internet service on board its aircraft on 15 November 2011, making it the first Chinese carrier to offer this service. However the service is not allowed on smartphones, only tablets and laptops.

In 2012, after pressure from PETA, Air China stated that it would no longer transport monkeys to laboratories. PETA welcomed the airline's announcement.

On July 3, 2013, in time for the company's 25th anniversary, Air China successfully tested Wireless LAN in flight. It was the first global satellite Internet flight in Mainland China.

In early 2015 it was announced that the airline had selected the Boeing 737 Next Generation and 737 MAX for its fleet renewal programme of 60 aircraft. The deal, with a value of over $6 billion at current list prices, has yet to be finalised.

Corporate affairs

The entity Air China Limited was registered in 2003, and its shares began trading in Hong Kong and London on December 15, 2004. Originally the airline corporate entity was Air China International, which was founded 2002 Air China International incorporated China Southwest Airlines and the air transportation services of the China National Aviation Corporation, becoming a new entity.

The Air China HQ Building, the corporate headquarters, is located in Zone A of the Tianzhu Airport Industrial Zone in Shunyi District, Beijing. The company registered office is on the ninth floor of the Blue Sky Mansion, also in Zone A of the Tianzhu Airport Industrial Zone.

The enterprise logo of Air China consists of an artistic phoenix pattern, the name of the airline written in calligraphy by former national leader Deng Xiaoping, and "AIR CHINA" in English. The phoenix logo is also the artistic transfiguration of the word "VIP". Air China is a member of the Star Alliance.
 
Air China is primarily based in its hub of Beijing Capital International Airport (IATA: PEK), where it operates numerous long-range aircraft on routes to North America, Europe, South America, Africa and Australia. Its fleet is made up of an assortment of Boeing and Airbus aircraft, including: Boeing 737s, 777s, 747s, 787s along with Airbus A319s, A320s, A321s and A330s. Air China also operates a second hub in Chengdu International Airport, where it primarily flies domestic routes, as well as Shanghai Pudong International Airport, where many international routes served.

Destinations

Air China's route network extends throughout Asia to the Middle East, Western Europe, and North America from its hubs at Beijing Capital International Airport and Chengdu Shuangliu International Airport. It also currently reaches a significant number of Asian, Australian and European destinations from Shanghai. Some international routes operate from Chengdu, Chongqing, Dalian, Hangzhou, Kunming and Xiamen. It is one of the few world airlines that fly to all six habitable continents.

On 10 December 2006, Air China began serving its first South American destination, São Paulo-Guarulhos (via Madrid-Barajas). This was the airline's longest direct flight. The service was initiated with a Boeing 767-300ER, but due to increased demand, the service has been upgraded to an Airbus A330-200, and later a Boeing 787-9.

Regular flights between mainland China and Taiwan started in July 2009. Due to the political status of Taiwan, all Air China airframes that operate flights to and from Taiwan are required to cover the flag of the People's Republic of China on the fuselage.

Air China introduced its new Airbus A330-300 to long-haul operations beginning with services to Düsseldorf, Germany in summer 2011. These aircraft provided the same two-class cabin standard as the Airbus A330-200 except that the economy cabin had no seat-back entertainment system installed (with the exception of the first two economy rows which also had increased legroom). Düsseldorf is now the third German destination on the Air China network. The airline launched a new Beijing-Milan-Malpensa service on 15 June 2011, complementing the airline's existing service to Milan from Shanghai.

Deliveries of the carrier's 19 new Boeing 777-300ERs commenced in mid-2011, with the aircraft forming the new "backbone of its future longhaul operations." The new Boeing 777-300ERs replaced the Boeing 747-400s on routes to U.S. destinations such as Los Angeles, New York, and San Francisco, but was expected to first enter service on flights to Paris from March 2012. The Boeing 777-300ER began to replace most 747 service once sufficient numbers entered the fleet. Air China expanded its operations in India with a Beijing-Mumbai route begun in September 2011, while the existing Delhi route was upgraded to the A330. The airline also launched service to Mumbai from Chengdu on 2 May 2012. The airline began using the Boeing 777-300ER on one of its two daily Beijing-Los Angeles flights on 1 February 2012. In the late-2012's to early 2013's, the airline replaced the Boeing 747-400s servicing the New York and San Francisco routes with the Boeing 777-300ER. With the addition of the Boeing 777-300ERs on the US routes, Air China increased frequency on the Beijing-New York route, changing the flights from 7 to 11 flights a week by adding two new flights to the route (CA989/990). On 21 January 2014, the airline launched its service to Hawaii with flights from Beijing to Honolulu, the first nonstop flights between the two cities. The airline also increased the frequency of service on the Beijing-Houston Intercontinental route from four times weekly to daily service from 30 March 2014. Beginning 10 June 2014, Air China introduced new nonstop service from Beijing to Washington-Dulles, operated by a Boeing 777-300ER. As of September 29 2015, Air China also introduced a 3 times weekly flight to Montréal–Pierre Elliott Trudeau International Airport in a codeshare with Air Canada. The Montreal flight was extended to Havana from 27 December 2015.

Air China started its direct flights to Johannesburg, South Africa from 29 October 2015.

Codeshare agreements
Air China codeshares with the following airlines:

 Air Canada (Joint Venture Partner)
 Air Dolomiti
 Air India
 Air Macau
 Air New Zealand
 Air Serbia
 All Nippon Airways
 Asiana Airlines
 Austrian Airlines
 Avianca
 Cathay Pacific
 China Express Airlines
 El Al
 Ethiopian Airlines
 EVA Air
 Finnair
 Hawaiian Airlines
 Juneyao Airlines
 Kunming Airlines
 LATAM Brasil
 LATAM Chile
 LOT Polish Airlines
 Lufthansa
 Scandinavian Airlines
 Shandong Airlines
 Shenzhen Airlines
 Singapore Airlines
 South African Airways
 Swiss International Air Lines
 TAP Air Portugal
 Tibet Airlines
 Turkish Airlines
 Uni Air
 United Airlines
 Virgin Atlantic
 WestJet

Interline agreements 
Air China has Interline agreements with the following airlines:
 Pakistan International Airlines

Fleet

Current fleet
, Air China operates the following aircraft:

Former fleet

PhoenixMiles

PhoenixMiles (literally "Phoenix Partner"), is the frequent flyer program of Air China and its subsidiary Shenzhen Airlines, Shandong Airlines, Tibet Airlines and Dalian Airlines. This is the first frequent flyer program launched in mainland China. It was designed to reward frequent flyers traveling internationally and domestically with Air China and its partner airlines.

Air China Cargo

Air China Cargo, is a subsidiary of Air China, that focuses on freight delivery and does not transport passengers. It operates routes across Asia, Europe and North America with its fleet of Boeing 747-400Fs, Boeing 757-200PCF and Boeing 777F.

Cabin services

First Class

First class is offered on all Boeing 747-400, Boeing 747-8 and Boeing 777-300ER, and was offered on all Airbus A340-300 and all Boeing 747-400M. First Class on the 777-300ER and 747-8 is Air China's latest flagship product, with  convertible beds, and featuring 23 inch AVODs at every seat. First Class on the 747-400 has  seat pitch, swiveling seat power, and fully flat bed recline. First Class on the 747-400 is one of two classes that sports AVOD screens. It is named Forbidden Pavilion due to its place in the cabin.

For retired aircraft, the First Class on the A340 also had a 180 recline but had a smaller screen. The First Class on the 747-400M was the same as the full passenger -400 variant but was instead located inside the nose on the main deck instead of between the number 1 and 2 doors seen on full passenger 747-400s. On Boeing 767-300s, First Class was laid out in a 2-1-2 configuration, with wider seats than business. These seats did not offer any individual inflight entertainment options. Boeing 767-200s and 767-300ERs did not offer First Class seats. On Boeing 777-200s prior to 2013 interior update, First Class had a 2-2-2 configuration, with personal screens without AVOD functionality.

In domestic flights, Business class on narrow-body jets are often referred to as First Class.

Business Class
Business class is offered on all Air China aircraft, and was offered on all of Air China's former aircraft. Business class comes in many different versions.

On Air China's narrow-body fleet, business class seats are recliners arranged in an 2-2 configuration.

On the Boeing 777-300ER and Boeing 787, Business Class would be located at the front of the cabin in a 2-2-2 configuration. The seats on some Boeing 777s were grey with full recline and IFE screens while Business Class on other Boeing 777s and all Boeing 787s were dark blue and cocoon shaped with seat-back IFE screens.

The Business Class on the Airbus A330 would be located in a small area at the front of the cabin. On newer A330s, Business Class would have light blue rectangle-like seats, with two reading lights located between seats in a 2-2-2 configuration and seat-back screens would be provided. These seats provide full recline. On older A330s, the screens would be smaller and there would be no storage space between screens, and a recline of 165 degrees.

The Airbus A350 feature Air China's latest product, released in August 2018 with the delivery of the first Airbus A350. The seats feature a reverse herringbone Collins Aerospace Super-Diamond seat arrangement at the front of the cabin in 8 1-2-1 configurated rows. The seats would be full flat reclinable, along with a shoulder belt for safety. There are no mid-overhead bins, allowing the cabin to look and feel bigger. There would also be aisle access to all seats, and 18-inch HD IFE screens.

On the Boeing 747s, Business Class is located in the nose of the aircraft and the Upper Deck, with a painted collage of the Summer Palace, which symbolizes good luck in China. The seats have partial recline, with a touch-screen function and remote function IFE screen on the back of seats and also located in the armrests. It was located in a 2-2-2 configuration at the back, with 2-2 rows continuing to the front and on the Upper Deck. These seats feature seat-back AVOD screens.

Historically, Business Class on the Airbus A340 would be very similar to what is offered on the Boeing 747-400, except that there is a 2-2-2 configuration with AVOD screens. Boeing 747-400M aircraft only had business class located on the upper deck while First class and Economy were on the main deck, with products similar to the Boeing 747-400. Boeing 767s and 777-200s featured armchair seats. On 767s they are arranged in a 2-2-2 configuration, whereas on 777s, they are arranged in a 2-3-2 configuration prior to 2013 interior update. Boeing 777-200s featured IFE screens whereas 767s did not. After the 2013 interior update, 777-200s featured a Business Product similar to Boeing 777-300ER and Boeing 787, but without IFE screens.

Premium Economy Class

Premium economy is offered on all of Air China's Airbus A330-300, Airbus A350-900, Boeing 747-8 and Boeing 787-9.
The Premium Economy class on the A350-900 is the newest product, with extra recline and bigger seats in a 2-4-2 configuration. Premium Economy on A330-300s, 747-8s and 787-9s were seats with extra legroom than Economy. In older A330s, these seats also featured AVOD screens and headrests, which the Economy Class did not.

Economy Class

Economy class is offered on all Air China aircraft. IFE with AVOD functionality is available on Boeing 777-300ER, Boeing 787-9, Airbus A350-900, Boeing 747 and newer Airbus A330 aircraft with different screen sizes and different systems from Panasonic and Thales. Universal power port and USB availability is different upon aircraft.

Accidents and incidents
On 16 December 1989, CAAC Flight 981 (operated by Air China), a Boeing 747-200BM (B-2448), was hijacked while flying the Beijing-Shanghai-San Francisco-New York City route. The hijacker's intended destination was Gimpo International Airport in Seoul, South Korea, but after South Korean authorities refused permission to land, the aircraft landed in Fukuoka Airport in Fukuoka, Japan. The hijacker was injured after being pushed out of the aircraft and was apprehended by Japanese authorities. The rest of the passengers and the crew were unharmed, and the aircraft returned to Beijing later that day.
On 10 August 1993, Air China Flight 973, a Boeing 767 was hijacked after takeoff from Beijing en route to Jakarta. A 30-year-old Chinese man passed a handwritten note to a flight attendant demanding to be flown to Taiwan. He threatened that his "accomplice" would destroy the aircraft unless he was flown to Taiwan. He was carrying a shampoo bottle containing a mixture of hydrochloric and nitric acids, and he threatened to disfigure nearby passengers with the acid unless his demands were followed. The aircraft was flown to Taipei International Airport, where the hijacker surrendered.
On 10 October 1998, Air China Flight 905, a Boeing 737-300 flying the Beijing-Kunming-Yangon route was hijacked by its pilot to Chiang Kai-shek International Airport in Taiwan. The pilot and his wife were apprehended by Taiwanese authorities. The passengers and the crew were unharmed, and the aircraft returned to mainland China later that day. This incident was the last hijacking to Taiwan of a mainland Chinese civilian aircraft.
 On September 11, 2001, an Air China Boeing 747 from Beijing to San Francisco, was escorted by two U.S. F-15s to Vancouver International Airport during Operation Yellow Ribbon, due to a communication problem. The aircraft landed at the airport without further incident.
On 15 April 2002, Air China Flight 129, a Boeing 767-200ER from Beijing to Busan, South Korea, crashed into a hill while trying to land at Gimhae International Airport during inclement weather, killing 129 of the 166 people on board. This is Air China's only fatal  accident to date.
On 27 August 2019, Air China Flight 183, an Airbus A330-343X from Beijing to Tokyo, Japan, was damaged beyond repair due to a cargo fire while on the ground at Beijing just shortly before departure. No one was injured.
On 23 September 2020, Air China Flight 4230, an Airbus A321neo (B-305G) operating from Fuzhou to Chengdu, was diverted to Changsha Huanghua International Airport after a passenger was found to have committed suicide in the aircraft's lavatory.

Controversy
Air China's inflight magazine Wings of China faced accusations of racism when they stated "London is generally a safe place to travel, however precautions are needed when entering areas mainly populated by Indians, Pakistanis and black people." in their September 2016 issue. On 8 September 2016, Air China issued an apology. Air China Media, which publishes the Wings of China magazine, said it wished to apologise to "readers and passengers who are feeling uncomfortable". It added: "This inappropriate description... was purely a work mistake by the editors and it's not the magazine's views...We will immediately recall this entire issue of magazines and draw lessons from this incident."

See also 

 Aviation industry in the People's Republic of China
 List of airlines of the People's Republic of China
 List of airports in the People's Republic of China
 List of companies of the People's Republic of China
 Transportation in the People's Republic of China

References

External links 

 

 
Companies formerly in the Hang Seng China Enterprises Index
Companies listed on the Hong Kong Stock Exchange
Companies listed on the London Stock Exchange
Companies listed on the Shanghai Stock Exchange
Companies in the CSI 100 Index
Airlines of China
Airlines established in 1988
Chinese companies established in 1988
2004 initial public offerings
Government-owned companies of China
Companies based in Beijing
Chinese brands
Star Alliance
H shares
Shunyi District